Porya Yali (born January 21, 1999, in Quchan) is an Iranian volleyball player who plays as an opposite spiker for the Iranian national team and Iranian club Paykan Tehran.

In 2018, Yali was invited to join the Iranian senior national team by Igor Kolaković and made his debut match against Poland in the 2018 Nations League.

Honours

National team
Asian Championship
Gold medal (1): 2019
Asian Cup
Silver medal (1): 2018
U21 World Championship
Gold medal (1): 2019
Asian U20 Championship
Gold medal (1): 2018
U19 World Championship
Gold medal (1): 2017
Bronze medal (1): 2015

Individual
Best Outside Spiker: 2018 Asian U20 Championship

References

External links
Pouria Yali on Instagram

1999 births
Living people
Iranian men's volleyball players
People from Quchan
Islamic Solidarity Games competitors for Iran